Zaav, Zav or Zou is the tenth Shah of the Pishdadian dynasty of Persia according to Shahnameh. He was a descendant of Nowzar and ruled over Iran about five years.

Mythological kings
Pishdadian dynasty